Fernando Daniel Pandolfi (born May 29, 1974 in Buenos Aires) is a former Argentine football striker who played most of his career for Argentine Primera División club Vélez Sarsfield. He was part of the successful team that won several trophies during the mid-1990s, including the Copa Libertadores and the Intercontinental Cup.

Career

Club
Nicknamed Rifle, Pandolfi started his professional career with Vélez Sársfield. He was often compared to Uruguayan star Enzo Francescoli due to their similar characteristics on the field. Pandolfi played 104 games with the club between 1994 and 2000. He also made a short spell on loan in the Italian Serie A with Perugia in 1997.

Towards the end of his career, Pandolfi signed for Boca Juniors. As a Xeneize, he replicated the success once achieved with Vélez by winning the Copa Libertadores and Intercontinental Cup, but this time in consecutive years. He left Boca without scoring a league goal, but scored five in international competitions. In 2002, while making his third spell with Vélez Sarsfield, Pandolfi announced his retirement from football at the age of 28.

National team
Pandolfi played two friendly matches with the Argentina national team in 1999 during Marcelo Bielsa's coaching era.

After football
In 2002 Pandolfi retired from football to dedicate himself entirely to music with his band, Actitud Sospechosa. In the same year, he was invited onstage by Los Piojos during a show at the Luna Park stadium to play guitar on their cover of Chuck Berry's "Around & Around". They released one album, Rockable.

Honours
Vélez Sarsfield
Copa Libertadores (1): 1994
Intercontinental Cup (1): 1994
Argentine Primera División (3):  1995 Apertura, 1996 Clausura, 1998 Clausura
Copa Interamericana (1): 1995
Supercopa Sudamericana (1): 1996
Recopa Sudamericana (1): 1997

Boca Juniors
Argentine Primera División (1): 2000 Apertura
Intercontinental Cup (1): 2000
Copa Libertadores (1): 2001

References

External links
 
 Argentine Primera statistics at Fútbol XXI 
 Career statistics at BDFA 

1974 births
Living people
Footballers from Buenos Aires
Argentine footballers
Argentina international footballers
Association football forwards
Club Atlético Vélez Sarsfield footballers
A.C. Perugia Calcio players
Serie A players
Serie B players
Argentine Primera División players
Boca Juniors footballers
Argentine expatriate footballers
Expatriate footballers in Italy
Argentine expatriate sportspeople in Italy